The Northern Luzon Command (abbrv. as NOLCOM) is the Armed Forces of the Philippines' unified command in charge of the Ilocos Region, Cordillera Administrative Region, Cagayan Valley, and Central Luzon, including the Scarborough Shoal and the Benham Rise. It is responsible for the defense of these areas against external aggresion, as well as combating terrorism and insurgency.

Mission
Conduct joint operations by integrating capabilities of assigned forces during peace, conflict and war including military operations other than war in its Joint Area of Operations in support of the AFP mission.

History
On 1 October 1972, the Northeast Command (NOREASCOM), Armed Forces of the Philippines, was organized and activated pursuant to General Headquarters, Armed Forces of the Philippines, Letter of Instruction 5/72, with an area of responsibility including: Cagayan, Ifugao, Isabela, Kalinga-Apayao, Nueva Vizcaya, Quirino and Aurora.

On 14 November 1981, pursuant to General Headquarters, Armed Forces of the Philippines Letter of Instruction 2/81, the NOREASCOM AOR was expanded to include the Regional Command 1 (RECOM 1) AOR. The resulting command was redesignated Northern Command (NORTHCOM).

On 1 April 1984, General Headquarters, Armed Forces of the Philippines issued Letter of Instruction 1/84, which redesignated NORTHCOM as Regional Unified Command 2 (RUC 2). Its AOR consisted of all the provinces contained in the Philippine's Region 2.

On 1 April 87, General Headquarters, Armed Forces of the Philippines issued Letter of Instruction 3/87 creating a unified command spanning Regions 1 and 2. This unit was designated as Northern Luzon Command (NOLCOM). It was initially headquartered at Camp Melchor F Dela Cruz, Gamu, Isabela. On 29 March 1988, NOLCOM was reorganized as an area command covering Northern and Central Luzon. Its headquarters was also transferred to Camp Aquino, Tarlac City.

1 April 2002, NOLCOM was deactivated and subsequently reactivated as a unified command pursuant to a Secretary of National Defence memo to the Chief of Staff, Armed Forces of the Philippines, dated 12 April 2002.

On 15 January 2009, to further enhance and support its internal security operations campaign in Central and Northern Luzon, NOLCOM activated Joint Task Force Amihan, pursuant to Letter of Instruction 01-2009. The JTF would be headed by the Deputy Commander, NOLCOM with Task Groups under it composed of personnel from the joint services under the Command and complemented by local Philippine National Police personnel.

Lineage of Commanding Officers
 BGen Bayani N Fabic AFP (29 Mar 1988 – 10 Jul 1989)
 BGen Orlando Q Antonio AFP (10 Jul 1989 – 29 Mar 1990)
 BGen Gumersindo T Yap AFP (29 Mar 1990 – 27 Dec 1990)
 BGen Ernesto B Calupig AFP (27 Dec 1990 – 17 Jun 1992)
 MGen Romulo F Yap AFP (17 Jun 1992 – 26 Aug 1993)
 MGen Orlando V Soriano AFP (26 Aug 1993 – 16 Apr 1994)
 MGen Edgardo T Batenga AFP (16 Apr 1994 – 7 Apr 1995)
 MGen Oswaldo P Villanueva AFP (22 Jul 1995 – 9 Jan 1997)
 MGen Ismael Z Villareal AFP (22 Jan 1997 – 1 Oct 1997)
 MGen Rene S Dado AFP (1 Oct 1997 – 19 Feb 1999)
 MGen Rolando C Bautista AFP (19 Feb 1999 – 30 Oct 1999)
 MGen Arturo B Carrillo AFP (30 Oct 1999 – 28 Mar 2001)
 LtGen Rodolfo C Garcia AFP (28 Mar 2001 – 5 Feb 2003)
 LtGen Romeo B Dominguez AFP (5 Feb 2003 – 16 Aug 2005)
 LtGen Romeo P Tolentino AFP (16 Aug 2005 – 21 Jul 2006)
 LtGen Bonifacio B Ramos AFP (21 Jul 2006 – 16 Aug 2007)
 LtGen Rodrigo F Maclang AFP (16 Aug 2007 – 6 May 2008)
 MGen Isagani C Cachuela AFP (6 May 2008 – 16 Jun 2009)
 LtGen Ricardo A David Jr AFP (16 Jun 2009 – 2 Jul 2010)
 LtGen Gaudencio S Pangilinan AFP (2 Jul 2010 – 22 Jul 2011)
 LtGen Jessie Dellosa AFP (22 Jul 2011 – 12 Dec 2011)
 (OIC) MGen Ricardo Banayat AFP (13 Dec 2011 – 20 Jan 2012)
 LtGen Anthony J Alcantara AFP (21 Jan 2012 – 5 July 2013)
 LtGen Gregorio Pio P. Catapang Jr. AFP (5 July 2013 – 9 June 2014 )
 LtGen Felicito Virgilio M Trinidad Jr AFP (9 June 2014 – 13 Aug 2015)
 LtGen Glorioso V Miranda AFP (13 Aug 2015 – 10 March 2016)
 LtGen Romeo Tanalgo AFP (10 March 2016 – Sep.4, 2017)
 LtGen Emmanuel Salamat (4 Sep 2017 – 7 July 2019)
 LtGen Ramiro Manuel A. Rey (7 July 2019 – 20 September 2020)
 LtGen Arnulfo Marcelo B. Burgos Jr. (20 September 2020 - 01 December 2021)
 (Acting) BGen Andrew D. Costelo (01 December 2021 - 24 January 2022)
 LtGen Ernesto C. Torres (24 January 2022 - 25 January 2023) 
 Maj. Gen Fernyl G. Buca

Organization
The following are the units that are under the Northern Luzon Command:
 5th Infantry (Star) Division, PA
 7th Infantry (Kaugnay) Division, PA
 Tactical Operations Wing Northern Luzon, PAF
 Naval Forces Northern Luzon, PN

Operations
 Territorial Defense Operations
 Internal Security Operations
 Humanitarian Assistance and Disaster Response Operations
 Law Enforcement Support Operations
 Multi-Stakeholder and Inter-agency Operations

Awards and decorations

Campaign streamers

Badges

References

 Official Site of the AFP NoLCom

Regional commands of the Philippines
Military units and formations established in 1987
Tarlac City